David Gascoyne (10 October 1916 – 25 November 2001) was an English poet associated with the Surrealist movement, in particular the British Surrealist Group. Additionally he translated work by French surrealist poets.

Early life and surrealism
Gascoyne was born in Harrow the eldest of three sons of Leslie Noel Gascoyne (1886–1969), a bank clerk, and his wife, Winifred Isobel, née Emery (1890–1972). His mother, a niece of the actors Cyril Maude and Winifred Emery, was one of two young women present when the dramatist W. S. Gilbert died in his lake at Grim's Dyke in May 1911. Gascoyne grew up in England and Scotland, attending Salisbury Cathedral School and London's Regent Street Polytechnic. He spent some of the early 1930s in Paris.

Gascoyne's first book, Roman Balcony and Other Poems, appeared in 1932, when he was 16. A novel, Opening Day was published the following year. However, it was Man's Life is This Meat (1936), collecting his early surrealism and translations of French surrealists, and Hölderlin's Madness (1938) that established his reputation. These, with his 1935 A Short Survey of Surrealism and his work on the 1936 London International Surrealist Exhibition, which he helped to organise, made him one of a small group of English surrealists that included Hugh Sykes Davies and Roger Roughton. At the exhibition, Gascoyne had to use a spanner to rescue Salvador Dalí from a deep-sea diving suit he had worn to give his lecture.

Political outlook
Gascoyne was an active anti-fascist, who took part in several protests against the British Union of Fascists in London's East End. He joined the Communist Party of Great Britain in 1936 and travelled to Spain, where he broadcast some radio talks for the Barcelona-based propaganda ministry. However, he soon became disillusioned with the Communists' treatment of the POUM and the Spanish Anarchists and left the party. Gascoyne had become friends with Charles Madge and through him became involved in the Mass Observation movement.

The diaries Gascoyne kept for six years from 1936 projected an existentialist auto-criticism, recording with honesty his acute emotional and spiritual crises, his struggle to accept his sexual identity as a homosexual, and his affairs. Apart from his involvement with communism and Mass-Observation, he had friendships with Dylan Thomas, Kathleen Raine, Lawrence Durrell, Henry Miller and others. Also apparent is strong engagement with existentialist philosophy.

When later interviewed for the book Authors Take Sides on the Falklands, Gascoyne expressed strong opposition to the Falklands War.

Later life and works
Gascoyne spent the years just before World War II in Paris, where he became friends with Salvador Dalí, Max Ernst, André Breton, Paul Éluard and Pierre Jean Jouve. His poetry of this period appeared in Poems 1937–1942 (1943) with illustrations by Graham Sutherland.

His poem Requiem, dedicated to the future victims of war, was written for his friend Priaulx Rainier to set to music. Her Requiem was first heard in 1956. She died on Gascoyne's 70th birthday, 10 October 1986.

Gascoygne returned to France after the war and lived there at intervals until the mid-1960s. His work from the 1950s appeared in A Vagrant and Other Poems (1950), and Night Thoughts (1956). These moved away from surrealism towards a more metaphysical and religious approach.

After suffering a mental breakdown, Gascoyne returned to England to spend the rest of his life on the Isle of Wight. He appears to have written little by then. Publication continued due to various "rediscoveries" of his works, with several collections and selections from Oxford University Press, Enitharmon and other imprints. Two books of his journals were returned to him after being lost for some time and were published in separate volumes by Alan Clodd at Enitharmon Press. When a third book was found, a collection including the additional material was edited by Lucien Jenkins for Skoob Books Publishing. For this Gascoyne himself provided what he called a "postface", one of the most extended pieces of writing from his later years.

In 1996, with the editorial assistance of Roger Scott, Gascoyne penned a tribute to his late friend of sixty years George Barker entitled The Fire of Vision, privately printed by Alan Anderson for Alan Clodd.

It was in Whitecroft Hospital on the Isle of Wight that Gascoyne met his wife, Judy Lewis, in a remarkable coincidence. Judy explains:
One of my favourite poems was called September Sun. I read it one afternoon and one of the patients came up to me afterwards and said "I wrote that." I put my hand on his shoulder and said "Of course you did, dear." Then of course when I got to know him I realised he had. They married in 1975. David Gascoyne died on 25 November 2001 at the age of 85.

Reputation
In a poetic field dominated by W. H. Auden and other more political and social poets, the surrealist group tended to be overlooked by critics and the public. He among others was lampooned by Dylan Thomas in Letter to my Aunt. Although Poems 1937–1942 (illustrated by Graham Sutherland and edited by Tambimuttu) received critical acclaim at the time, it was only with renewed interest in experimental writing associated with the British Poetry Revival that their work began to be discussed again. His Collected Poems appeared in 1988. Work of his was included in the Revival anthology Conductors of Chaos (1996).

In later years, Gascoyne seemed remarkably resigned to not altogether achieving in poetry what he had set out to do when young, and not sustaining a remarkable early promise. Still, he was pleased whenever he received critical notice. In his later years his attention was drawn to a balanced assessment of his work by Martin Seymour-Smith in his immense Guide to Modern World Literature (Macmillan), and he was gratified by the tone of the commentary and the assertion that he was still widely read. A tribute volume, For David Gascoyne On His Sixty-Fifth Birthday, appeared in 1981 with contributions from 26 poets, including Adrian Henri, Lawrence Durrell, and Michael Hamburger.

Bibliography and criticism
Robert Fraser, Night Thoughts: The Surreal Life of the Poet David Gascoyne, OUP, 2012. 
Colin Benford, David Gascoyne A Bibliography Of His Works, Heritage Books, 1987.

Selected works to 1984

References

External links
David Gascoyne Home Page
David Gascoyne Collection at the Beinecke Rare Book and Manuscript Library, Yale University.
Robert Fraser: David Gascoyne and the Missing Portrait (drawing by Bettina Shaw-Lawrence) 
Tambimuttu: Re-inventing the Art of Poetry Illustration at the British Library.
David Gascoyne papers at the British Library

1916 births
2001 deaths
People from Harrow, London
People educated at Salisbury Cathedral School
Alumni of the University of Westminster
Bisexual men
British bisexual writers
English LGBT poets
Surrealist poets
British modernist poets
English anti-fascists
English male poets
20th-century English poets
20th-century English male writers
20th-century English LGBT people